Yoandri Kindelán Álvarez  is a male beach volleyball player from Cuba, who participated with Leonel Munder in the SWATCH-FIVB U-21 Men's World Championships in Mysłowice, Poland finishing in the 29th position in the Qualification Tournament.

With Yunieski Ramírez he won the gold medal in the men's competition at the NORCECA Beach Volleyball Circuit 2007 at Guatemala and in 2009 in Puerto Vallarta. With Leonel Munder he won in the 2008 season in Manzanillo and Guadalajara.

Playing with Javier Jiménez, he won the gold medal in April 2009 at the III Alba Games in Ciego de Avila, Cuba.

References

This player was played with Étoile_Sportive_du_Sahel November 2016 to May 2017.

External links
 
 

Year of birth missing (living people)
Living people
Cuban beach volleyball players
Men's beach volleyball players